Harry Alan Towers (19 October 1920 – 31 July 2009) was a British radio and independent film producer and screenwriter. He wrote numerous screenplays for the films he produced, often under the pseudonym Peter Welbeck. He produced over 80 feature films and continued to write and produce well into his eighties. Towers was married to the actress Maria Rohm, who appeared in many of his films.

Background
The son of a theatrical agent, Towers was born in Wandsworth, and became a child actor after attending the Italia Conti Academy of Theatre Arts. He then became a prolific radio writer while serving in the Royal Air Force during World War II becoming head of the RAF radio unit on the British Forces Broadcasting Service attaining the rank of Pilot Officer.

In 1946, he and his mother Margaret Miller Towers started a company called Towers of London that sold various syndicated radio programmes around the world, including The Lives of Harry Lime and The Black Museum with Orson Welles, Secrets of Scotland Yard with Clive Brook, Horatio Hornblower in which Michael Hordern played the famous character created by C. S. Forester, and a series based on the Sherlock Holmes stories, featuring John Gielgud as Holmes, Ralph Richardson as Watson, and Orson Welles as Professor Moriarty.

Based on his radio success, in the mid-1950s he produced television shows for ITV such as Armchair Theatre, The Golden Fleece, The Boy About the Place, Teddy Gang, The Lady Asks for Help, The Scarlet Pimpernel, The Suicide Club, The Little Black Book, The New Adventures of Martin Kane, A Christmas Carol, 24 Hours a Day, Down to the Sea, Gun Rule, and many others.

On 7 April 1956, Billboard magazine announced J. Elroy McCaw's WINS in New York made a deal with Harry Alan Towers for deejay Alan Freed to do a special taped 1/2-hour rock 'n' roll record show on Saturday nights over Radio Luxembourg, which beamed to most of the countries of Free Europe.

Vice activities
In 1961 Towers, with girlfriend Mariella Novotny, was charged with operating a vice ring at a New York hotel, but he jumped bail and returned to Europe. Novotny, in her statement to the FBI, claimed Towers was a Soviet agent responsible for providing compromising information on individuals for the benefit of the U.S.S.R. Lobster Magazine ran an article in 1983 citing sources who alleged Towers was linked with (among others) Stephen Ward, Peter Lawford, the Soviet Union, and a vice ring at the United Nations. Hearst Corporation newspapers had already mentioned Towers's name in a 1963 article featuring coded references to a liaison between a pre-White House John F. Kennedy and Novotny, a known prostitute. The charges against Towers were dropped in 1980 after he paid a £4,200 fine for jumping bail.

Film career
Towers began producing feature films in 1962, sometimes writing the screenplay. Towers filmed in various countries such as South Africa, Ireland, Hong Kong, Bulgaria and others. A number of his films and scripts were based on the works of Sax Rohmer, such as Sumuru and the popular Fu Manchu series of five films starring Christopher Lee. He also adapted the novels of Agatha Christie (And Then There Were None and the Miss Marple series), the Marquis de Sade, and the works of Edgar Wallace. Towers produced three separate film versions of And Then There Were None, each set in a different locale.

He frequently collaborated with director Jesus Franco during the late 1960s and early 1970s. Towers had a hand in writing and/or producing numerous films directed by Franco, including 99 Women (1969), The Girl from Rio a.k.a. Rio 70 (1969), Venus in Furs (1969), Marquis de Sade: Justine (1969), Eugenie… The Story of Her Journey into Perversion (1970), The Bloody Judge (1970), and Count Dracula (1970). Franco also helmed the last two Fu Manchu films The Blood of Fu Manchu (1968) and The Castle of Fu Manchu (1969).

Death
In a letter from the New York literary agency Albert T Longden Associates, discussing the Sax Rohmer estate, reference was made to Towers producing a sixth Fu Manchu movie, The Children of Fu Manchu, for release in 2009; if the project existed, nothing came of it.

In his last months, Towers was working with Ken Russell on an adaptation of Moll Flanders. He died after a short illness in a hospital in Canada on 31 July 2009.

Filmography

References

Further reading
Cathal Tohill and Pete Tombs Immoral Tales: European Sex & Horror Movies 1956-1984 (1994)
Dave Mann Harry Alan Towers: The Transnational Career of a Cinematic Contrarian (2014)
Harry Alan Towers's Autobiography: "Mr. Towers of London: A Life in Show Business" (2013)

External links

"Harry Alan Towers: film impresario", The Times, 5 August 2009

Jason Nissan "Harry Alan Towers: A hand in a bawdy romp is yours for £2,000", Independent on Sunday, 3 November 2002

English film producers
English radio producers
English male screenwriters
Royal Air Force personnel of World War II
1920 births
2009 deaths
20th-century English screenwriters
20th-century English male writers
Royal Air Force officers
20th-century English businesspeople